Betula pumila (dwarf birch or bog birch) is a deciduous shrub native to North America. Bog birch occurs over a vast area of northern North America, from Yukon in the west to New England in the east and all the way to Washington and Oregon, inhabiting swamps and riparian zones in the boreal forests.

Description
It reaches  in height. Like other birches, it is monoecious and its reproductive structures are catkins. Leaves are alternate but close together, especially on slow growing individuals. Leaves are coarsely dentate and rounded at the base.

References

External links
 
 

pumila
Flora of North America
Trees of continental subarctic climate
Trees of Canada